The Short SA.6 Sealand was a light, commercial amphibious aircraft designed and produced by Short Brothers. It was sized to accommodate between five and seven passengers as well as to suit the general overseas market in territories with suitable water access and/or runways. It could take off from and land on rivers, lakes and sheltered bays or prepared runways, and could be flown by either a single pilot or a pilot and navigator.

On 22 January 1948, the maiden flight of the Sealand took place; the first examples entered service roughly two years later. A total of two production variants of the type were produced, the SA.6 Sealand I and the SB.7 Sealand III, an extended version with longer wings, a deeper rudder and a strengthened hull. The proposed SB.2 Sealand II was intended as the type's second prototype, but was never completed as such, instead becoming the first of the batch of 4 pre-production aircraft G-AKLM to G-AKLP. The Sealand was flown by both civilian and military operators, the Indian Navy being a particularly prominent operator of the type. Its operational life including regular flights within various areas of the world, including Borneo, East Bengal, Norway and Venezuela.

Development
In the immediate aftermath of the Second World War, conventional wisdom amongst operators and aircraft manufacturers alike held that the flying boats still had a relevant role to play in multiple niches. Shorts was a particularly active participant in the field, producing the Short Sandringham, a de-militarised conversion of the wartime Short Sunderland maritime patrol aircraft, which was proving itself in various corners of the world, while also undertaking the development of the Short Solent, essentially an improved derivative of the Sunderland for the civilian sector, as well. One of the company's designers, C. T. P. Lipscomb, examined the prospects for building three different sizes of flying boat; these concepts were referred to as SA.6 (small), SA.7 (medium) and SA.8 (large), respectively.

The compact SA.6 concept appeared to have considerable sales potential, being sized as to facilitate its use from inland lakes and other bodies of water. During July 1946, the company announced its intention to produce the SA.6, assigning it the name Sealand, as a five-seven passenger commercial amphibious aircraft. Design work was divided between the company's Rochester and Belfast facilities, the former worked on the hull and tail unit while the latter focused on the wing and engine configuration. The design drew greatly upon the larger Solent, but also incorporated the latest advances in structural design, including the use of draw-sunk stiffeners for the ribs and bulkheads. Additionally, the wing of the Sealand was given a higher aspect ratio than the Solent to improve both its rate of climb and efficiency in cruise flight.

On 19 January 1948, the prototype Sealand was launched; it performed its maiden flight three days later from the waters of Belfast Lough, piloted by Shorts' Chief Test Pilot, Harold Piper. Havin been initially flown from the water, as it lacked its undercarriage and several other pieces of equipment, the prototype was quickly furnished with remaining elements and flown to Sydenham Airport to commence land-based testing. One early modification was the lowing of its engines, which was changed to reduce the unduly high interference drag induced by their original position. Despite intentions to construct a second prototype powered by an alternative engine, the Alvis Leonides radial engine, as difficulties procuring the de Havilland Gipsy Queen 70-3 engines had been anticipated, no Sealands were ever built with the Alvis powerplant. Quantity production of the type was sanctioned by the Ministry of Civil Aviation in mid-1949.

Design
The Short SA.6 Sealand was a high wing cantilever monoplane amphibious aircraft. It shared its basic configuration with the larger Short Solent flying boat, being roughly half its size and featuring some structural advancements nonetheless. The Sealand featured all-metal construction, possessing both a flying boat hull and underwing floats for buoyancy. It was also provisioned with a standard tail-wheel undercarriage; the two main wheels retracted into recesses in the hull below the wings, while the tailwheel retracted behind the hull's planing bottom. The retraction mechanism was powered by a 450lb/sq pneumatic system; the aircraft was not fitted with a hydraulic system.

The passenger cabin, which was sized to accommodate up to seven passengers, was effectively divided into two halves (connected via a gangway) by the box frames formed by the recesses for the retractable undercarriage. This cabin was lined by a total of six particularly large windows; a single entrance door was present on the port side of the fuselage, along with an extension door for freight loading or air ambulance missions. Hinged drop panels beneath the sliding windows and an external step were present to ease the typically complex mooring process. The cockpit of the Sealand was designed to be suited for operation by a solo pilot, as well as by one accompanied by a navigator.

The Sealand was powered by a pair of de Havilland Gipsy Queen 70-3 inverted inline air cooled piston engines, each capable of generating up to 340 hp. These engines were intentionally mounted as high as reasonably achievable on the wing so that sufficient clearance from spray would be provided, although this was reduced somewhat during trials in order to reduce drag. To ease water handling, reversible-pitch propellers were installed, which could be used to reduce the landing distance required; this arrangement was effective enough that a water rudder was deemed to be unnecessary.

Operational history

In addition to the prototype, a total of four pre-production aircraft were produced, the first of which was retained by Shorts for demonstration purposes (eventually crashing in fog while on a sales tour of Norway, killing both the pilot and the sales representative). The other three pre-production Sealands were eventually sold to overseas operators in Norway and Borneo. Early on in the type's career, it was determined that, while well suited for operating from sheltered waters and possessing largely favourable seaworthiness qualities, landing upon the open sea was challenging for Sealand pilots, leading to some modifications being made to improve its performance.

As early as 1949, Shorts commenced vigorous sales efforts surrounding the Sealand; according to aviation author C. H. Barnes, demonstrations of the aircraft typically made good impressions on prospective customers. A further batch of ten Sealands were built and sold to a variety of small operators, including one (G-AKLW, later SU-AHY) equipped as an "air yacht" with luxurious fittings for a private client in Egypt and given the name Nadia. An early sale of a single Sealand to an American customer garnered the distinction of being the first post-war sale of an aircraft to the American market.

During 1952, the Indian Navy ordered a batch of ten Sealands, which were built to an enhanced specification. Accordingly, these aircraft featured dual controls, increased fuel capacity and uprated engines. All ten aircraft were delivered between January and November 1953. The final Sealand in service with the Indian Navy was withdrawn twelve years later; one aircraft was preserved and placed on display at the Indian Naval Aviation Museum.

A second Sealand exists at the Air Museum in Belgrade, which is claimed to have been registered originally as G-AKLF. This registration was not, however, assigned to a Sealand; this aircraft is also said to have borne the local registration YU-CFK, which indicates that it was in fact the aircraft with the Shorts manufacturing number SH.1567, i.e. G-AKLS.
 
A third, G-AKLW (originally bought by the wealthy Egyptian client mentioned above) is under rebuild (2008) at the Ulster Folk and Transport Museum at Cultra, Holywood, Northern Ireland.

Shorts retained the first prototype (G-AIVX) for company use, often using it without the wing-floats and struts to increase its payload. Seeing several years of use, it was ultimately scrapped after its Certificate of Airworthiness expired in April 1955.

Variants
SA.6 Sealand
Prototype powered by two De Havilland Gipsy Queen 70-2 engines, one built
SA.6 Sealand I
Production variant with two De Havilland Gipsy Queen 70-3 engines, 14 built.
SB.2 Sealand II
Proposed variant with Alvis Leonides engines, not built
SB.7 Sealand III
Variant for operation in Norway with eight-passengers and the landing gear removed, two conversions.
SA.6 Sealand 
Variant for India with De Havilland Gipsy Queen 70-4 engines, dual-controls and extra fuel tanks for six hours endurance, ten built.

Operators

Civilian operators

 Vestlandske Luftfartsselskap (VLS) – two aircraft modified as Srs 1M seaplanes with landing gear removed.

 East Bengal Transport Commission

Aero Nord Sweden

 Shell Oil
 Short Brothers

 Christian & Missionary Alliance

 JAT

Military operators

 Indian Navy – ten Series 1L aircraft with Gipsy Queen 70-4 engines and dual controls, all delivered in 1953.

 Royal Saudi Air Force – one aircraft donated to the RSAF for search and rescue duties.

 Yugoslav Air Force – two Series 1F aircraft transferred from JAT.

Specifications (Sealand I)

See also

References

Citations

Bibliography
 Barnes, C.H. Shorts Aircraft since 1900. London: Putnam, 1967.

External links

 Orthographic drawings of the Sealand via fortunecity.com.

1940s British civil utility aircraft
Flying boats
Short Brothers aircraft
High-wing aircraft
Amphibious aircraft
Aircraft first flown in 1948
Twin piston-engined tractor aircraft